The Mayor of North Yorkshire is a proposed elected position that will see residents of North Yorkshire (excluding districts in the Tees Valley Combined Authority) elect a mayor for the first time in May 2024. The agreement, signed on 1 August 2022 (Yorkshire Day), will create a new combined authority across the region led by a directly elected mayor, who will have the power to spend the money on local priorities such as transport, education and housing.

References

Mayors of places in England
Local government in North Yorkshire